Hornsey Lane is a road in the London Borough of Haringey, forming part of its border with the London Borough of Islington, and classified as the B540 between Highgate Hill leading to Highgate Village and Crouch End Hill leading to Crouch End.

Hornsey Lane crosses the A1 by means of Hornsey Lane Bridge.

References

Streets in the London Borough of Haringey
Streets in the London Borough of Islington